Apocalypse 2000: Economic Breakdown and the Suicide of Democracy (also known as Apocalypse 2000: Economic Breakdown and the Suicide of Democracy, 1989-2000 or Apocalypse 2000) is a 1987 novel by English economists Peter Jay and Michael Stewart.

In the novel, trade imbalances, entrenched unemployment in Europe, pervasive inequality in the United States, and a massive default by Latin American countries creates economic and political upheaval, which Western leaders are shown incapable of addressing. A former televangelist becomes the US President in 1993 and brings in stark and disruptive economic policies. The US military withdraws from Europe and instead is redeployed to Asia to fight a civil war in the Philippines, as well as to combat drug smuggling at home.

The following year in Europe, a populist personality named Olaf D. Le Rith (an anagram of Adolf Hitler) leads his Europe First Movement (EFM) to victory in European Parliament elections. He runs on an anti-American, anti-immigration and protectionist platform, and as argued in his book Europe First, he considers European integration and a Pan-European identity as necessary to solve Europe's problems. Le Rith then forces European countries to cede sovereignty to the European Economic Community which he now controls.

Come 2000, the US has an unofficial unemployment rate in excess of 20%, and a level of violence akin to Lebanon or South Africa of the 1980s. In Europe, where the EFM rules with an iron fist, unemployment and inflation had largely been eliminated the continent, the over-centralised European economy was plagued with shortages and inefficiencies. Both the US and Europe have erected massive trade barriers, which undermines Japan's export-orientated economy and ultimately social fabric.

The novel, written in 1987, assumed the Soviet Union and East Germany would still be in existence, that apartheid in South Africa would end violently, and that India would be teetering on breaking up.

Reviewing the book in the London Review of Books, R.W. Johnson criticised some of its prognostications. The US deficit in the 1980s, while large, constituted only a tiny faction of US GNP. The authors ignored the possibilities that a deficit could be managed by currency devaluations, or that there were US interest groups with sufficient political heft to prevent a slide to protectionism.

Speculative fiction and studying the future

To label this book as a novel would be to limit its application.  For while the authors don't claim it to be a prediction, there is a clear sense that they believe the underlying theme of apocalypse is a possible, even likely trajectory for the next decade or so from their writing. They did get a number of things (factors and events) generally correct, like: a young Democratic president (happened in 1992, not 1988 as stipulated); certain general social conditions (such as illiteracy rates in US); the shut down in social welfare spending; and such other items as general budgetary figures, terrorist attacks, stock market failures, Japanese society and its international political-economic juggernaut, and the rise in right-wing ethnic-cultural nationalism, to name a few.  While the timing and specifics of certain events in the book (like the terrorist attack on the Waldorf-Astoria c. 1992) were off, their occurrence and effects generally occurred. Yet other significant events—like the collapse of the USSR, the rise of China, the emergence of the Digital revolution and all that meant, issues of climate change – were simply missed. The election of a tele-evangelist figure as President in 1992 is problematic because of timing and portrayal; arguably, Trump played a charismatic figure with the same policy ineptitude and incompetence as noted in the book but the timing was off.

While many of the factors and events they noted actually were approximately accurate, ultimately, the overall prognosis/forecast turned out to be very wrong for the time period covered.  What were the reasons for this overall failure?  Lessons from this book can point to common problems in creating scenarios and forecasts.

There are several explanations for the failures:

1.  The overall narrative to this speculative futures scenario is seemingly based on the historical analogy to the rise of Nazism in the 1930s.  The central charismatic figure in the book and leading the Europe First Movement into power in Europe in the 1990s was Le Rith (the anagram of Hitler). The emphasis on the driving forces of both unemployment and inflation, the questionable tactics used to eliminate opposition and being elected all match point by point to the Nazi rise to power 6o years earlier.  The problem, though, is casting the narrative to fit that historical analogy, rather than allowing new elements and factors to play out independently.

2.  The narrative is also driven by a certain degree of economic materialist determinism (making it somewhat Marxist in nature).  Perceptions and beliefs by the masses were the result of economic conditions, reducing their concerns and hot-button issues often to economic factors. In the context of the economic tumbling occurring in the narrative where economic distress was generally real, this does make some sense, but if there is no mass economic distress, mass opinions and conflicts may reflect other non-economic factors.

3.  Political decision-makers were preoccupied with several interrelated macro-economic variables: unemployment, inflation and budget/balance of payment deficits.  Other policy variables were drawn in, such as tax rates, savings and interest rates, import and export levels.  While the Phillips curve postulating an inverse relationship between unemployment and inflation was not mentioned, that relationship seemed to be implicit in all the deliberations and decisions.  Single-minded mass concerns about employment and income security had its counterpart in reflected decision-maker attention,

4.  The map of the social system they used relied on a tightly coupled set of processes with almost real-time reporting of conditions, very short lag times between notice and decision, and rapid diffusion of effects in some cases, while in others, there seemed to be little effects and/or long delays.

5.  From the starting points of their analysis – c. 1985, the trajectory of conditions in the narrative seemed to diverge dramatically from the actual course of events: in the narrative, both unemployment and inflation rose and increased over the next 5–10 years, while neither of these occurred in reality.  Overall, the projected collapse of Europe into a united, semi-totalitarian society under a Hitler-like figure controlling the reins of power and the collapse of the US into basically a society locked into a civil war by 2000 simply did not come anywhere close to being true.  The former condition still seems at some remove while the latter seemed to be a bit closer to realization in the aftermath of Trump’s defeat in 2021.

6.  Policy-makers were preoccupied, even obsessed with budget and balance-of-payment deficits.  That did not seem to be true.  Indeed, it is arguable how much those factors actually mattered to policy-makers.

6.  The narrative depended on the unique occurrence of events and/or their timing. Wild cards such as scandals, crashes (planes, markets), terrorist attacks (including assassination, kidnappings, etc.) played important roles in shaping public opinion at the times of elections and important policy legislation.  Personalities were also important.

In general, the flow of the narrative towards collapse was driven by the inability of the political system to respond effectively to the twin problems of rising unemployment and inflation. The failure of the political system was but a reflection of the deeps-seated faults in the culture that prized individual consumption, me-first irresponsibility over a more prudent duty towards public well-being.  The errors in the unfolding of the narrative noted above must have contributed significantly and substantially to the completely inaccurate overall conclusions of the book.

References

Fiction set in the 1990s
Economics in fiction
Dystopian novels
1987 novels